Mansbach is a surname. Notable people with the surname include:

Adam Mansbach (born 1976), American author
Carl von und zu Mansbach (1790–1867), Hessian-Norwegian military officer and diplomat
Johann Friedrich von und zu Mansbach (1744–1803), Hessian-Danish military officer
Richard W. Mansbach (born 1943), American political scientist
Steven Mansbach (born 1950), American historian
Abraham Mansbach (born 1949), Israelí-Mexican philosopher